Frank Brian Wrathall Jnr. (born 4 October 1986 in Lancaster) is a British motor racing driver who has competed in the British Touring Car Championship. He won his first race on 21 October 2012 in the final race of the 2012 BTCC season.

Having graduated from karting in 2007, Wrathall made his car racing debut in the Ginetta G20 Championship. Having spent a single season in the series, he then switched to the Ginetta G50 Cup for 2008, going on to win the title in 2010. He joined the British Touring Car Championship in 2011, driving for the family-run Dynojet Racing Team.

Following a 21-month prison sentence for causing death by careless driving in 2014, Wrathall has not returned to the BTCC.

Career

Ginetta Racing
In 2007, Wrathall swapped from karts to racing Ginetta cars. He took part in the 2007 Ginetta G20 Championship, debuting at Oulton Park and finishing the season in 8th place, with two podium results. This won him Ginetta Rookie of the Year. He graduated to the G50 Cup for the 2008 season, finishing second in 2008 and 2009 seasons. This spurred Wrathall on during the 2010 Ginetta G50 Cup season, leading to him eventually being crowned champion, after five race wins and 19 podium finishes.

British Touring Car Championship
Wrathall moved up to the BTCC in 2011, racing for Dynojet in a NGTC Toyota Avensis . At Knockhill, Wrathall became the first driver to reach the overall podium in an NGTC car, with two third place finishes and a fourth from the three races. He took another third place in the opening race at Rockingham before improving on this to finish second in race two.

Wrathall continued in the British Touring Car Championship in 2012, once again racing for Dynojet in the Toyota Avensis now sponsored by Mac Tools. He took his first podium of the season in round 9 at Thruxton, finishing ahead of Jason Plato to finish third. At the final round of the season at Brands Hatch, Wrathall took his first ever BTCC win in the final race, ahead of Matt Neal and newly crowned Champion Gordon Shedden.

Dynojet Race Team
Dynojet Race Team, is a family run team, founded by Frank Wrathall Snr. He built the team up to help develop his son Frank’s racing career. The team was regarded as one of the best teams in the Ginetta race series. The team is sponsored by Dynojet, who make parts for the automotive industry. In the 2010 Ginetta G50 Cup season, Dynojet won both the drivers and teams championships.

Prosecution
On 14 May 2012, Wrathall was at the wheel of a van involved in a collision with a cyclist on a roundabout. The police laid information against him, alleging that he caused death by dangerous driving as he had been using a mobile phone for 8 minutes prior to the collision, in which a 47-year-old cyclist was killed. Wrathall denied the charge. The first trial was judged a mistrial, and the judge ordered a media ban of the events. On 7 February 2014 he was jailed for 21 months after pleading guilty to the lesser charge of careless driving.  He was also disqualified from driving for four years.

Racing record

Complete British Touring Car Championship results
(key) (Races in bold indicate pole position – 1 point awarded just in first race) (Races in italics indicate fastest lap – 1 point awarded all races) (* signifies that driver lead race for at least one lap – 1 point given all races)

References

External links
 Frank Wrathall's Website

1986 births
Living people
British Touring Car Championship drivers
Prisoners and detainees of England and Wales
Sportspeople from Lancaster, Lancashire
Ginetta GT4 Supercup drivers